Gasteig HP8 is a culture centre in Munich, Bavaria, Germany, in the Sendling district. It is a provisional location, replacing the functions of the Gasteig in  while it is under restoration planned to 2027. Gasteig HP8 opened on October 8, 2021. It houses the  concert hall and the  library in Hall E, a listed historic monument.

History 
Gasteig HP8 was built as a provisional home for the institutions housed at the Gasteig in Haidhausen while it is under restoration planned to 2027. Gasteig HP8 was opened on 8 Oktober 2021. The name was found by a competition, and is short for the address Hans-Preißinger-Straße 8.

Isarphilharmonie 
The concert hall Isarphilharmonie was designed by architects Gerkan, Marg und Partner. It was realised by the Swiss Nussli Group. The acoustic was designed by Yasuhisa Toyota and his office Nagata Acoustics. The large hall seats around 1800 people. It serves the Münchner Philharmoniker, the Symphonieorchester des Bayerischen Rundfunks and other orchestras. It is a steal construction of a volume of almost 60.000 Kubikmeter. The walls are made from prefabricated dark wood elements. The seats are also dark, in wood and textiles, and contrast to the stage floor in light-coloured wood. The stage is c. 272 m2. The new building includes the former Trafohalle.

Hall E 
The hall, a protected historic monument, serves as a foyer for the Isarphilharmonie, with gastronomy, and houses Münchner Stadtbibliothek, focused on music, languages and life-long learning. The hall is open daily from 7am to 11pm.

References 

Cultural centers
Culture in Munich
Music venues in Germany
Tourist attractions in Munich